Step 13 is a British live drum and bass/rock band from London.

History
Step 13 was founded in 1996 as a collective of DJs and musicians, linked by a common interest in music experimentation. Originally known as Step 13 Recordings, they would DJ jungle and drum and bass at free party events and club nights across South and East England and throughout London.

In 2000, Step 13 hosted their first regular club night, Mixamotosis  at Madame Jojo's in Soho. The night was the first to be exclusively dedicated to UK Hip Hop and saw artists like DJ Skitz, Roots Manuva, Rodney P, Estelle (musician), Skinny Man, Scratch Perverts, and Task Force performing.

In 2002, Step 13 formed a band to inject a new lease of life into the drum and bass scene which was suffering from musical stagnation. Based at Studio 7K in East London, the band originally had 13 members, their first live gig came in June 2003 at Cargo in Shoreditch. Within a short time they developed a sound and feel to their music, in part taking up the genre which Roni Size Reprazent had begun.

In 2006, Step 13 established the first live drum and bass band night in the UK, NRFTW (No Rest For The Wicked) at the Rhythm Factory, Whitechapel.

By 2008, and with female vocalist Lucy Randell, who sings on the fourth The Streets album Everything Is Borrowed, Step 13 spent the summer touring music festivals, including headlining at Kingston Green Fair, and appearing on two stages at the Glastonbury Festival.

2009 has seen Step 13 concentrating work in the studio, but have played out in London a few times, notably at seOne club at London Bridge. And also again at Glastonbury Music Festival in June.

In their own words 
According to their interview on Channel 4 Music

"...Step 13 was formed from a group of four DJs and producers in 2003. Sick of the DJ fever of the late nineties and full of post millennium apathy they formed a band in search of fresh vibes and a new way of taking their music to the people. 
The following years saw experimentation with different line ups and instruments. Band members came and went, some confused, some excited many dumbfounded but never bored, they eventually evolved into a seven piece featuring drums, bass, guitar, keys, samples/synths and sublime vocals from MC Ishu (Manasseh sound system) and Lucy Randell.
Their enthusiasm for eclectic music saw them dabbling with drum and bass, dub, psychedelia and rock to create their own hybrid sound which they call Broc’n’Roll, left-field drum and bass with bite.
After making a strong live debut at London’s, Cargo and being hailed as a key live drum and bass act by Knowledge magazine, Step13 went on to perform at many venues and towns throughout the UK. Since the start of 2005 the band has taken time to write a complete new set of material. The upfront live drum and bass vibe is still strong, but the ideas are more focused with a few eclectic surprises.
Step 13 consider ourselves champions of humanitarian causes and strive to bring about peace and harmony through our music. Call us old hippies but It's all about peace and love."

References

English rock music groups
British drum and bass music groups